Vista Road Recreation Ground is a cricket ground in Clacton-on-Sea, Essex. The first recorded first-class cricket match on the ground was in 1931 when Essex County Cricket Club played there against Lancashire.  Essex played a total of 60 first-class matches on the ground between 1931 and 1966, playing their final first-class match there against Leicestershire in the 1966 County Championship.

The ground has also held five Second XI fixtures between 1948 and 1952 for the Essex Second XI in the Minor Counties Championship.

In local cricket, the ground is the home venue of Clacton Cricket Club.

References

External links
Vista Road Recreation Ground on CricketArchive
Vista Road Recreation Ground on CricInfo

Cricket grounds in Essex
Clacton-on-Sea
Sports venues completed in 1931
Essex County Cricket Club